Black Hand or The Black Hand may refer to:

Extortionists and underground groups
 Black Hand (anarchism) (La Mano Negra), a presumed secret, anarchist organization based in the Andalusian region of Spain during the early 1880s
 Black Hand (extortion), an extortion racket practised by the Camorra and Mafia members in Italy and the United States
 Black Hand (Chicago), the extortion as practised in Chicago 
 Black Hand (Mandatory Palestine) (al-Kaff al-Aswad), an Islamist militant group in the British Mandate of Palestine in the 1930s
 Black Hand (Serbia) (Црна Рука), a secret society devoted to Serbian unification in the 1910s 
 Black Hand (Slovenia) (Črna roka), an anti-communist organization that carried out assassinations in the Slovene Lands during World War II
 Yiddish Black Hand, a.k.a. Jewish Black Hand Association, a criminal organization that operated on New York's Lower East Side during the early 20th century

People

 Black Hand (graffiti artist), Iranian street artist
 José Manuel Martínez (born 1962), known as "El Mano Negra", former Mexican drug cartel hitman
 Mano Negra (wrestler) (born 1951), Mexican luchador (professional wrestler)

Art, entertainment, and media
 Black Hand Gang, a children's comics series by Hans Jürgen Press
 The Black Hand (book), a non-fiction book by Stephan Talty
 Mano Negra (band), a French alternative, ska punk band

Characters
 Black Hand (comics), a DC Comics supervillain
 Black Hand (World of Darkness), fictional sect of vampires
 Black Hand, a mercenary faction in Just Cause

Film
 The Black Hand (1906 film), an American silent gangster film, directed by Wallace McCutcheon Sr.
 The Black Hand (1917 film), a 1917 Austrian silent crime
 Black Hand (1950 film), an American film noir, starring Gene Kelly as an Italian immigrant fighting the Black Hand extortion racket 
 The Black Hand (1968 film), a French-Italian crime thriller film
 The Black Hand (1973 film), an Italian crime film starring Lionel Stander as a cop who infiltrates the Mafia